György Bánlaki (born 21 March 1948 in Budapest) is a Hungarian diplomat who served as Hungarian Ambassador to the United States between 1994 and 1998. He was also President of the Hungarian Atlantic Council from 2003 to 2009.

References

External links
Újra Bánlaki György a Magyar Atlanti Tanács elnöke 
Diplomatic Representation for Hungary

Sources

1948 births
Living people
Diplomats from Budapest
Ambassadors of Hungary to the United States